Casein kinase I isoform alpha is an enzyme that in humans is encoded by the CSNK1A1 gene.

Interactions 

Casein kinase 1, alpha 1 has been shown to interact with Centaurin, alpha 1 and AXIN1.

See also 
 Casein kinase 1

References

Further reading